Pseudanthus is a genus of plants under the family Picrodendraceae. The genus is endemic to Australia described as a genus in 1827.

Species 

 
Formerly included
moved to Stachystemon 
Pseudanthus axillaris (A.S.George) Radcl.-Sm -  Stachystemon axillaris A.S.George
Pseudanthus brachyphyllus (Müll.Arg.) F.Muell. -  Stachystemon brachyphyllus Müll.Arg.
Pseudanthus chryseus Müll.Arg. -  Stachystemon polyandrus (F.Muell.) Benth.
Pseudanthus nematophorus F.Muell. - Stachystemon nematophorus (F.Muell.) Halford & R.J.F.Hend. - three-flowered pseudanthus
Pseudanthus nitidus Müll.Arg. -  Stachystemon virgatus (Klotzsch) Halford & R.J.F.Hend.
Pseudanthus occidentalis F.Muell. - Stachystemon virgatus (Klotzsch) Halford & R.J.F.Hend.
Pseudanthus polyandrus F.Muell. -  Stachystemon polyandrus (F.Muell.) Benth.
Pseudanthus vermicularis (Planch.) F.Muell. - Stachystemon vermicularis Planch.
Pseudanthus virgatus (Klotzsch) Müll.Arg. - Stachystemon virgatus (Klotzsch) Halford & R.J.F.Hend.

Names in homonymic genera
In 1852, Wight used the same name, Pseudanthus, to refer to plants in the Amaranthaceae. Thus was created an illegitimate homonym. He also coined one species name, i.e.
Pseudanthus brachiatus (L.) Wight, now called Nothosaerva brachiata (L.) Wight

See also
Taxonomy of the Picrodendraceae

References

 
Malpighiales genera
Endemic flora of Australia